The El Abra Formation is a geologic formation in Mexico. It preserves fossils dating back to the Cretaceous period.

See also 

 List of fossiliferous stratigraphic units in Mexico

References

External links 
 

Geologic formations of Mexico
Cretaceous Mexico
Albian Stage